Moudud Ahmed (24 May 1940 – 16 March 2021) was a Bangladeshi lawyer and politician. He was a standing committee member of Bangladesh Nationalist Party. Ahmed was elected as a Jatiya Sangsad member total five times from Noakhali-1 and  Noakhali-5 constituencies.

Ahmed served as the post master general of Bangladesh after independence. From the 1980s on he held numerous political offices for short stints in the Government of Bangladesh, including Deputy Prime Minister (1976–1978 and 1987–1988), Prime Minister of Bangladesh (1988–1989), Vice President of Bangladesh (1989–1990), and Minister of Law, Justice and Parliamentary Affairs (2001–2006).

Early life and career
Ahmed was born on 24 May 1940 to a Bengali Muslim family of Bhuiyans in the village of Manikpur in Noakhali District, Bengal Province. He was the fourth child of Maulana Momtazuddin Ahmad and Begum Ambia Khatun. His father was a leading Islamic scholar of Hadith who taught at Calcutta Alia Madrasa, Presidency College, Calcutta and Dacca University. Ahmed obtained his BA and MA in political science from the University of Dacca. He was called to the English Bar at Lincoln's Inn in London in 1966.

While in the UK, Ahmed was part of a growing intellectual movement among East Pakistani students in envisioning an independent Bangladesh. After returning to Dacca, he joined the legal team of Sheikh Mujibur Rahman during the Agartala Conspiracy Case trial in 1968. He accompanied the Bengali delegation led by Sheikh Mujib to the Rawalpindi Round Table Conference with Field Marshal Ayub Khan in 1969. Ahmed witnessed many important developments in the run up to Bangladesh's independence. He joined the Provisional Government of Bangladesh in Calcutta during the 1971 Liberation War. He worked in its External Publicity Division. Ahmed addressed many humanitarian rallies for Bengali genocide victims. He once stirred an entire rally in London holding up a Daily Mirror article titled Birth of a Nation and crying out "we are alive, but we are not yet free".

Ahmed was one of the founding members of the 33 member Committee for Civil Liberties and Legal Aid which was established to protect the opposition politicians and members of civil society who were facing the wrath of the government on 31 March 1974. Ahmed was the first Postmaster General of Bangladesh Post Office after the Independence of Bangladesh.

Ahmed was jailed on orders from Sheikh Mujibur Rahman in December 1974, but was later released.

BNP and Jatiyo Party
In the late 1970s, Ahmed was courted by Lt General Ziaur Rahman, the first military dictator of Bangladesh. Between 1976 and 1978, he served as Deputy Prime Minister. In 1977, he led the Bangladeshi delegation to the United Nations General Assembly. He was elected to parliament from the Bangladesh Nationalist Party (BNP) in 1979. Ahmed's feud with Shah Azizur Rahman led to him being sacked by Zia.

In 1985, Ahmed joined the newly formed Jatiyo Party of Lt General Hussain Muhammad Ershad. He was appointed again as Deputy Prime Minister in the cabinet and held the portfolios of the Industries Ministry and the Communications Ministry. President Ershad appointed Ahmed as Prime Minister in 1988. Serving for a year in the office of premier, he oversaw relief operations during the catastrophic 1988 Bangladesh flood. Ahmed was invited for talks with several Western leaders, including with Margaret Thatcher at 10 Downing Street. However, Ershad replaced Ahmed with the pro-Chinese leftwinger Kazi Zafar Ahmed in 1989. Ahmed was elevated to the post of Vice President of Bangladesh in 1989. He resigned in December 1990 to make way for Justice Shahabuddin Ahmed to become acting president and lead the transition to parliamentary democracy.

After serving a stint in prison following Ershad's ousting, Ahmed was invited by Khaleda Zia to return to the BNP in 1996. He was elected to parliament while in jail in 1996. He was reelected for the fifth time in 2001. Begum Zia appointed him as Minister of Law, Justice and Parliamentary Affairs in 2001.

In 2007, the military-backed caretaker government arrested Ahmed on charges of illegal alcohol possession. But the case was dismissed at the Supreme Court in 2008. After his release from prison, Ahmed received a jubilant reception at his constituency in Noakhali. He was reelected to parliament in 2008. He was arrested again in 2013 by the Awami League government. His family told The Guardian that the country was turning into a prison under Prime Minister Sheikh Hasina.

Ahmed joined his party in boycotting the 2014 general election.

Under the Awami League administration, Ahmed and his brother Monzur faced charges of illegally occupying their properties in the posh Gulshan area of Dhaka. They maintained that the case was politically motivated. On 8 June 2017, he was evicted from his house by Rajdhani Unnayan Kartripakkha. Ahmed described his eviction as "political vengeance" by the Awami League government. Former Prime Minister and chairperson of Bangladesh Nationalist Party, Khaleda Zia, condemned the move to evict him. He had lived in the house for more than 40 years.

Personal life and family
Ahmed was married to Hasna Jasimuddin Moudud, a daughter of the Bengali poet Jasimuddin.  They have a daughter, poet Ana Kashfiya Moudud. Their eldest son, Asif Momtaz Moudud, died at the age of 3. Another son, Aman Momtaj Moudud, died of dengue fever in 2015.

Ahmed was a practicing barrister in the Supreme Court of Bangladesh. He was a fellow at Heidelberg University in Germany and a visiting fellow at Harvard University in the United States. In the fall of 1997, he was the Bland Visiting Professor at George Washington University's Elliott School of International Affairs. He was also a member of the Elliott School's International Council.

Death
On 30 December 2020, Ahmed was hospitalized in Dhaka due to a decrease in haemoglobin levels and eventually suffered a stroke. A few weeks later, a pacemaker was implanted.

Ahmed was hospitalized for pulmonary congestion and kidney complications in Singapore on 1 February 2021. He died a month later on 16 March at the age of 80.

On 12 March 2022, Ahmed's wife, Hasna Jasimuddin Moudud, claimed that Ahmed was assassinated.

Publications 
Ahmed is the author of nine books.  Publications include:
 Shongshod-e Ja Bolechhi, Dhaka: The University Press Limited, 2006, 
 South Asia: Crisis of Development-The Case of Bangladesh, Dhaka: The University Press Limited, 2003
 Democracy and the Challenge of Development: a Study of Politics and Military Interventions in Bangladesh, Dhaka: The University Press Limited, 1995
 Bangladesh: Era of Sheikh Mujibur Rahman, Dhaka: The University Press Limited, 1983, 
 Bangladesh: Constitutional Quest for Autonomy, South Asian Institute of Heidelberg University, 1976 and University Press Limited, Dhaka, 1979
 Chaloman Itihas, the book to inform the next generation the history of the country particularly the history of HM Ershad government.

References

Further reading
 Md Mahmudul Hasan, “At Heidelberg with Moudud Ahmad.” New Age, Mar 20, 2021. https://www.newagebd.net/article/133169/at-heidelberg-with-moudud-ahmad

1940 births
2021 deaths
2nd Jatiya Sangsad members
5th Jatiya Sangsad members
6th Jatiya Sangsad members
8th Jatiya Sangsad members
9th Jatiya Sangsad members
Bangladesh Nationalist Party politicians
Communications ministers of Bangladesh
George Washington University faculty
Industries ministers of Bangladesh
Law, Justice and Parliamentary Affairs ministers of Bangladesh
Prime Ministers of Bangladesh
Road Transport and Bridges ministers of Bangladesh
University of Dhaka alumni
Vice presidents of Bangladesh
People from Companiganj Upazila, Noakhali